The 2019 LEN Super Cup was the 38th edition of the annual trophy organised by LEN and contested by the reigning champions of the two European competitions for men's water polo clubs. The match was played between European champions Ferencváros (winners of the 2018–19 LEN Champions League) and CN Marseille (winners of the 2018–19 LEN Euro Cup) at the Piscine Pierre Garsau in Marseille, France, on 2 November 2019.

Ferencváros contested the match for the third consecutive year, the first in this streak as Champions League's title holder. The Hungarian team won its second consecutive Super Cup, the fourth in total, managing to come back from a 4-goal down.

Teams

Squads

Head coach: Zsolt Varga

Head coach: Marc Amardeilh

Match

References

External links
 Official LEN website
 Microplustiming.com (official results website)

LEN Super Cup
S
LEN
LEN